Jaszai Patera is a  to  wide volcanic caldera on Venus containing steep sided lava domes.

References

Volcanoes of Venus